The second season of ABC reality television series The Bachelor premiered on September 25, 2002. The show featured 28-year-old Aaron Buerge, a banker from Butler, Missouri. The season concluded on November 20, 2002, with Buerge choosing to propose to 27-year-old school psychologist Helene Eksterowicz. They ended their engagement weeks after the finale.

Contestants
The following is the list of bachelorettes for this season:

Future appearances
Heather Cranford returned for the sixth season of The Bachelor along with season four contestant, Mary Delgado, where she placed 9th/12th after having been eliminated the week she arrived. Gwen Gioia competed in the first season of Bachelor Pad, placing 9th/11th.

Elimination Chart

 The contestant won the competition.
 The contestant quit the competition.
 The contestant was eliminated at the rose ceremony.

Episodes

References

02
2002 American television seasons
Television shows filmed in California